Cine Club is a Canadian short film television series which aired on CBC Television from 1964 to 1967.

Premise
Each episode included up to three short films originating from various nations in various styles from documentaries to cartoons. The debut film was Les Mistons by François Truffaut of France. Canadian content included Jack Kuper's Run. The Running Jumping & Standing Still Film by Richard Lester and Peter Sellers of the United Kingdom also aired during the first season as did works by Ludovic Kennedy (The Sleeping Ballerina) and Ernest Pintoff (The Violinist and The Shoes).

Many of the Cine Club films were not previously broadcast or were rarely accessible to Canadians. The series featured different hosts and producers each season; Rosalind Farber chose the films for broadcast and became Cine Club's producer in the final season.

Scheduling
This half-hour series was broadcast as follows (times in North American Eastern):

References

External links
 

CBC Television original programming
1964 Canadian television series debuts
1967 Canadian television series endings
Black-and-white Canadian television shows
Canadian motion picture television series